Ross Gavin Wright (born 25 August 1986) is a New Zealand rugby union player who plays for  in the Bunnings NPC competition. He has also played for the Māori All Blacks.

References 

New Zealand rugby union players
1986 births
Living people
Northland rugby union players
New Zealand Māori rugby union players
Blues (Super Rugby) players
Rugby union props
Rugby union hookers
Māori All Blacks players